Alice & June is the tenth studio album by French band Indochine. It was released in France on 19 December 2005 in both single-disc and limited edition two disc editions. Even though it was a smaller success than Indochine's previous album (they sold more than a million copies of Paradize), the band played many sold-out shows on the tour that followed. A DVD, filmed at Lille, was released in 2007.

Brian Molko appears on the tracks "Pink Water 2" and "Pink Water 3".

Track listing

Single disc edition
 "Ceremonia" - 3:38 (hidden track)
 "Les Portes Du Soir" - 5:09
 "Alice & June" - 3:42
 "Gang Bang" - 3:24
 "Ladyboy" - 4:47
 "Black Page" - 4:13
 "Pink Water 3" - 4:59 (with Brian Molko of Placebo)
 "Adora" - 4:05
 "Un Homme Dans La Bouche" - 4:36
 "June" - 5:04
 "Sweet Dreams" - 4:59
 "Belle Et Sebastiane" - 3:34
 "Talulla" - 2:53
 "Morphine" - 5:13
 "Pink Water 2" - 5:23 (with Brian Molko)*

Double disc edition

Disc 1 – "Alice – Au pays des cauchemars – La promesse"
 "La Promesse" - 0:43
 "Les Portes Du Soir" - 5:09
 "Alice & June" - 3:42
 "Gang Bang" - 3:24
 "Ladyboy" - 4:47
 "Black Page" - 4:13
 "Pink Water 3" - 4:59 (with Brian Molko)
 "Adora" - 4:05
 "Un Homme Dans La Bouche" - 4:36
 "Vibrator" - 2:24
 "Ceremonia" - 3:38

Disc 2 – "June – Au pays des merveilles – Le pacte"
 "Le Pacte" - 0:40
 "June" - 5:04
 "Sweet Dreams" - 4:59
 "Belle Et Sebastiane" - 3:34
 "Crash Me" - 5:10
 "Aujourd'Hui Je Pleure" - 3:27 (with AqME)
 "Harry Poppers" - 2:56 (with Wampas)
 "Talulla" - 2:53
 "Morphine" - 5:13
 "Starlight" - 4:55 (with Scala & Kolacny Brothers)
 "Pink Water 2" - 5:23 (with Brian Molko – hidden track)*

"Pink Water 2" is identical to "Pink Water 3", but it is sung in English.

Certifications and sales

Charts

References

External links
 Detailed album information at Indo-chine.org

2005 albums
Indochine (band) albums